The 5th U-boat Flotilla (German 5. Unterseebootsflottille), also known as Emsmann Flotilla, was a U-boat flotilla of Nazi Germany's Kriegsmarine during World War II.

The flotilla was formed in December 1938 in Kiel under the command of Korvettenkapitän Hans-Rudolf Rösing. It was named in honour of Oberleutnant zur See Hans Joachim Emsmann, a U-boat commander during World War I, who died on 28 October 1918 after his U-boat  was sunk by a mine. The flotilla was disbanded in January 1940 and the boats were all transferred to 1st Flotilla.

The flotilla was re-formed as "5th U-boat Flotilla" in June 1941 under the command of Kapitänleutnant Karl-Heinz Moehle as a training flotilla with her base in Kiel. In 1946 Moehle was sentenced to five years in prison, after being found guilty of passing the Laconia Order to new U-boat commanders before they went out on patrol. He was released in November 1949.

Flotilla commanders

References 

05
Military units and formations of the Kriegsmarine
Military units and formations established in 1938
Military units and formations established in 1941
Military units and formations disestablished in 1940
Military units and formations disestablished in 1945